A Postal Index Number (PIN; sometimes redundantly a PIN code) refers to a six-digit code in the Indian postal code system used by India Post. On 15 August 2023, the PIN system will be celebrated its 51st anniversary.

History 
The PIN system was introduced on 15 August 1972 by Shriram Bhikaji Velankar, an additional secretary in the Government of India's Ministry of Communications. The system was introduced to simplify the manual sorting and delivery of mail by eliminating confusion over incorrect addresses, similar place names, and different languages used by the public.

PIN structure 

The first digit of a PIN indicates the zone, the second indicates the sub-zone, and the third, combined with the first two, indicates the sorting district within that zone. The final three digits are assigned to individual post offices within the sorting district.

Postal zones 
There are nine postal zones in India, including eight regional zones and one functional zone (for the Indian Army). The first digit of a PIN indicates the zone and is allocated over the 9 zones as follows:

Sorting district 

The third digit of a PIN, combined with the first two digits, represents a specific geographical region (except in the case of the functional zone for the Army) called a sorting district that is headquartered at the main post office of the largest city in the region and is known as the sorting office. A state may have one or more sorting districts depending on the volume of mail handled.

Service route 
The fourth digit represents the route on which a delivery office is located in the sorting district. This is "0" for offices in the core area of the sorting district.

Delivery office 

The last two digits represent the delivery office within the sorting district starting from "01" which would be the General Post Office (GPO) or head office (HO). The numbering of the delivery office is done chronologically with higher numbers assigned to newer delivery offices. If the volume of mail handled at a delivery office is too large, a new delivery office is created and the next available PIN is assigned. Thus, two delivery offices situated next to each other will only have the first four digits in common.

Delivery system 
Each PIN is mapped to exactly one delivery post office which receives all the mail to be delivered to one or lower offices within its jurisdiction, all of which share the same code. The delivery office can either be a General Post Office (GPO), a head office (HO), or a sub-office (SO) which are usually located in urban areas. The post from the delivery office is sorted and routed to other delivery offices for a different PIN or to one of the relevant sub-offices or branch offices for the same PIN. Branch offices (BOs) are located in rural areas and have limited postal services.

Notes

References

External links 
 Find Pincode – India Post
 Find All India Pincode

Indian pincodes
Postal system of India
India